Richard de Klerk  is a Canadian actor and producer, known for his work in independent Canadian films. His filmography includes Repeaters, Cole, Fathers & Sons, Bang Bang You're Dead, Mr. Rice's Secret and CBGB.

Early life and education
De Klerk was born in Vancouver. His father, Gerry de Klerk is a businessman from the Netherlands and his mother, Irene Nelson, is Canadian. He has a sister named Melanie, who works as an assignment editor with Global National. While living in Europe, he attended the American School of The Hague. In his late teenage years, he moved back to Canada. There, he studied at Lyric School of Acting in Vancouver. De Klerk has stated that he also holds a European Union passport.

Career
He has over 40 roles in films, short films, and television films and series.

Television
He appeared as Will Scarlett in the film Beyond Sherwood Forest opposite Erica Durance and Julian Sands, guest starred in The 4400 and the Andie Macdowell series Cedar Cove. His other television works include recurring roles in Strange Empire, Reign and Motive.

Film
For the film Beijing, New York (2015) (original title 北京，紐約), which also starred Lin Chi-ling and was shown at a number of festivals, he won three awards in 2016, including Barcelona Planet Film Festival Jury Prize for  Best Actor and IndieFEST Film Awards Award Of Excellence for Best Lead Actor. He was nominated for three Leo Awards, including Best Lead Performance by a Male in a Feature Length Drama for Cole in 2010.  De Klerk worked with director Carl Bessai on several films. He starred in Part of the Game, 2004 film, for which he won Hertfordshire Film Festival Jury Award for Best Actor.

In August 2017, Richard, together with Rampart Films Inc. and several members of his family were sued. A notice of civil claim in BC Supreme Court was filed by Fred and Katarina Kranz for fraud and unjust enrichment towards Richard's father Gerry de Klerk and mother Irene Nelson, and against Richard and his sister Melanie DeKlerk for conversion and civil conspiracy. The claimants, Fred and Katarina Kranz claim they have lent Gerry de Klerk and his companies more than $23 million, and allegedly were repaid "from other funds they themselves provided to Gerry in relation to other investments." They also claim that more than $1.2 million remains unpaid for the film loans.

Personal life 
de Klerk married Cara Gee in 2019.

Filmography

Film

Television

References

External links

The Perils of Pre-Covid Quarantine in ALONE WOLF

Canadian people of Dutch descent
Canadian male film actors
Canadian male television actors
Living people
21st-century Canadian male actors
Year of birth missing (living people)